The Queenstown rock gecko or Tembu flat gecko (Afroedura tembulica) is a species of African gecko found in South Africa.

References

tembulica
Endemic reptiles of South Africa
Reptiles described in 1926
Taxa named by John Hewitt (herpetologist)